Farnaq (also known as Kharnagh, Kharnaq, Khārneh, Kharneq, and Khor Naq) is a village in Hastijan Rural District, in the Central District of Delijan County, Markazi Province, Iran. At the 2006 census, its population was 120, in 37 families.

References 

Populated places in Delijan County